Bessel Fjord is a fjord in northwestern Greenland. Administratively it belongs to the Avannaata municipality.

Knud Rasmussen described the fjord entrance in the following terms:

Geography
Bessel Fjord stretches roughly from north to south for about 60 km. It is a long and narrow fjord lined with high mountains rising steeply from the shore. Hannah Island, a small island, lies in the area of its mouth by the Kennedy Channel, Cape Bryan is on the western side of the mouth and Cape Maynard on the northeastern.

This fjord is located northeast of Washington Land, at the northern end of Daugaard-Jensen Land. The Petermann Peninsula forms its eastern shore. There are large ice caps on both landmasses flanking the fjord.

Bibliography
H.P. Trettin (ed.), Geology of the Innuitian Orogen and Arctic Platform of Canada and Greenland. Geological Survey of Canada (1991)

See also
List of fjords of Greenland

References

External links
Greenland place names and spelling, by T. Higgins

Fjords of Greenland